David Harold Albiston (born 22 December 1944) is a former Australian rules footballer who played for Hawthorn in the Victorian Football League (VFL) during the 1960s.

A rover from the Melbourne High School Old Boys, Albiston played from the forward pocket in Hawthorn's losing 1963 VFL Grand Final team. His father Harold also played at Hawthorn and he is the nephew of Alec and Ken Albiston.

References

External links

1944 births
Living people
Hawthorn Football Club players
Australian rules footballers from Victoria (Australia)
Melbourne High School Old Boys Football Club players